Douglas Alan Berry (born June 3, 1957) is a Canadian former professional ice hockey player, a centreman in the World Hockey Association (WHA) and the National Hockey League (NHL).

Early life 
Berry was born in New Westminster, British Columbia, and raised in neighboring Burnaby. He played college hockey for the Denver Pioneers men's ice hockey at the University of Denver, where he was selected to the All-WCHA First Team for 1977–78.

Career 
Berry was drafted in 1977 by both the WHA and the NHL, choosing to start his major professional career with the WHA's Edmonton Oilers, in that league's final (1978–79) season, appearing in 29 games and scoring six goals and three assists. He then played two seasons in the NHL, with the Colorado Rockies, appearing in 121 games and scoring 10 goals and 33 assists for 43 points.

Berry played the majority of his career in West Germany, spending 10 seasons in the top level Eishockey-Bundesliga, appearing in 402 games and scoring 286 goals and 351 assists for 537 points. While playing with the Kölner Haie (Cologne Sharks), the team won three consecutive Bundesliga championships. Berry retired from hockey after the 1991–92 Bundesliga season.

Personal life 
Berry's younger brother, Ken Berry, also played in the NHL and Bundesliga.

Career statistics

Regular season and playoffs

Awards and honors

References

External links
 

1957 births
Living people
Adler Mannheim players
AHCA Division I men's ice hockey All-Americans
Calgary Cowboys draft picks
Canadian ice hockey centres
Colorado Rockies (NHL) draft picks
Colorado Rockies (NHL) players
Dallas Black Hawks players
Edmonton Oilers (WHA) players
Fort Worth Texans players
Genève-Servette HC players
Ice hockey people from British Columbia
Kelowna Buckaroos players
Kölner Haie players
Denver Pioneers men's ice hockey players
Sportspeople from Burnaby
Sportspeople from New Westminster
Wichita Wind players